Jeanine Dubié (born 3 January 1958 in Lourdes, Hautes-Pyrénées) is a politician, member of the National Assembly of France, where she represents the 2nd constituency of the Hautes-Pyrénées.

Early life and education 

A social worker by profession, Jeanine Dubié worked in the Hospital Center of Lourdes before becoming a member of the Territorial Administration at the General Council of the Hautes-Pyrénées, in the field of assistance to municipalities, territorial policies, local development and the medico-social.

Office director of Jean-Michel Baylet, president of the general council of Tarn-et-Garonne, for two years, she then directed from 2002 to 2012, the retirement home "Accueil du Frère Jean" in  Galan.

Political career

Member of the Hautes-Pyrénées's Departmental council 

Jeanine Dubié is listed under the PRG label in the 2008 French cantonal elections in the canton of Galan and leads in the first round with 46.59% of the votes and is elected with 72.59% of the votes in the second round. She chairs the Commission "Social Action, Inclusion, Politics of the City".

Member of the National Assembly 

In the legislative elections of 2012, Jeanine Dubié was elected in the 2nd constituency of the Hautes-Pyrénées with 64.74% of the vote.

She was co-rapporteur of two parliamentary information reports, the first on the match between the supply and needs of vocational training and the second on the evaluation of the reception policy for asylum seekers in the first In 2015, she is co-rapporteur of a parliamentary report on the evaluation of the tourist reception policy and in 2016, on the evaluation of public support for hydrotherapy.

Candidate in the French legislative elections of 2017, she is reelected in the second round with 51% of the votes.

In the National Assembly, Jeanine Dubié sits on the Social Affairs Committee. 
She is also a Vice President of the Reception conditions for migrants's Working Group; and Vice President of the Hydrotherapy's Working Group.

References

1958 births
Living people
People from Lourdes
Politicians from Occitania (administrative region)
Radical Party of the Left politicians
Radical Movement politicians
Deputies of the 14th National Assembly of the French Fifth Republic
Deputies of the 15th National Assembly of the French Fifth Republic
Women members of the National Assembly (France)
21st-century French women politicians